Fairview is a historic home located near Delaware City, New Castle County, Delaware.  It was built in 1822 as a two-story, five-bay rectangular brick dwelling with a Georgian style, center hall plan. It was modified in 1880 by architect Frank Furness to add a shingled third story, four notable corbeled chimneys, and an addition.

It was listed on the National Register of Historic Places in 1982.

References

Houses on the National Register of Historic Places in Delaware
Georgian architecture in Delaware
Houses completed in 1822
Houses in New Castle County, Delaware
Frank Furness buildings
National Register of Historic Places in New Castle County, Delaware
1822 establishments in Delaware